Ooi Tze Liang (born 19 November 1993 in Penang) is a Malaysian diver. Ooi has represented Malaysia in various diving events such as 2014 Glasgow Commonwealth Games, 2013 Southeast Asian Games and 2015 Southeast Asian Games.

Early and personal life
Tze Liang (who also goes by David) was born in Penang and started diving at the age of eight.  He is currently studying at University of Malaya.  He enjoy playing Lego and watching YouTube videos.

Career
At the 2014 Glasgow Commonwealth Games, Ooi became the first Malaysian male to win a Commonwealth gold medal in diving when he won the men's 3 metre springboard event. He also took the silver medal in the men's 10 metre platform event. He finished second to Tom Daley of England.

After winning the gold medal for men's 3 meter springboard event at the 6th Asian Diving Cup, Ooi became the third diver (after Pandelela Rinong and Wendy Ng) to qualify for the 2016 Summer Olympics.

He competed at the 2022 Commonwealth Games where he came 7th in the Men's 3 metre springboard event.

Awards and recognition
Ooi was awarded Olympic Council of Malaysia (OCM)-Sports Toto Award for outstanding performance at the 2015 Singapore Sea Games.
.

References

External links
 
 
 
 
 
 

1993 births
Living people
People from Penang
Malaysian sportspeople of Chinese descent
Malaysian male divers
Sportspeople from Penang
Olympic divers of Malaysia
Divers at the 2016 Summer Olympics
Commonwealth Games gold medallists for Malaysia
Commonwealth Games silver medallists for Malaysia
Divers at the 2010 Commonwealth Games
Divers at the 2014 Commonwealth Games
Divers at the 2018 Commonwealth Games
Divers at the 2022 Commonwealth Games
Asian Games medalists in diving
Divers at the 2010 Asian Games
Divers at the 2014 Asian Games
Divers at the 2010 Summer Youth Olympics
Commonwealth Games medallists in diving
Asian Games silver medalists for Malaysia
Asian Games bronze medalists for Malaysia
Medalists at the 2014 Asian Games
Medalists at the 2010 Asian Games
Southeast Asian Games gold medalists for Malaysia
Southeast Asian Games silver medalists for Malaysia
Southeast Asian Games medalists in diving
Divers at the 2018 Asian Games
Competitors at the 2011 Southeast Asian Games
Competitors at the 2013 Southeast Asian Games
Competitors at the 2015 Southeast Asian Games
Competitors at the 2017 Southeast Asian Games
Competitors at the 2019 Southeast Asian Games
Competitors at the 2021 Southeast Asian Games
21st-century Malaysian people
Medallists at the 2014 Commonwealth Games